Uropeltis liura, commonly known as the Ashambu shieldtail and Günther's earth snake, is a species of snake in the family Uropeltidae. The species is endemic to India.

Geographic range

Type locality: "Malabar".

Habitat
The preferred natural habitat of U. liura is forest, but it has also been found in cardamom and tea plantations.

Description
The dorsum of U. liura is purplish brown, with each scale darker-edged, and with transverse series of small yellow black-edged ocelli. The venter and sides have large alternating black and yellow spots or crossbands.

Adults may attain  in total length (including tail).

The dorsal scales are in 19 rows behind the head, in 17 rows at midbody. The ventrals number 174-188, and the subcaudals number 8-12.

The snout is obtusely pointed. The rostral is about ⅓ the length of the shielded part of the head, and the portion visible from above is as long as its distance from the frontal. The nasals are in contact with each other behind the rostral. The frontal is longer than broad. The eye is small, its diameter less than ½ the length of the ocular shield. The ventrals are twice as wide as the contiguous scales. The tail is round or slightly laterally compressed. The caudal dorsal scales are smooth or with very faint keels. The terminal scute is very small, with two points.

Behavior

Reproduction
U. liura is ovoviviparous. The young are born in May or June, and the usual litter size is four.

References

Further reading

Beddome, R.H. (1886). "An Account of the Earth-Snakes of the Peninsula of India and Ceylon". Annals and Magazine of Natural History, Fifth Series 17: 3-33.
Boulenger, G.A. (1890). The Fauna of British India, Including Ceylon and Burma. Reptilia and Batrachia. London: Secretary of State for India in Council. (Taylor and Francis, printers). xviii + 541 pp. (Silybura liura, p. 262).
Günther, A. (1875). "Second Report on Collections of Indian Reptiles obtained by the British Museum". Proceedings of the Zoological Society of London 1875: 224-234 + Plates XXX–XXXIV. (Silybura liura, new species, p. 228 + Plate XXXI, figure B).
Smith, M.A. (1943). The Fauna of British India, Ceylon and Burma, Including the Whole of the Indo-Chinese Sub-region. Reptilia and Amphibia. Vol. III.—Serpentes. London: Secretary of State for India. (Taylor and Francis, printers). xii + 583 pp. (Uropeltis liura, new combination, pp. 84–85).

External links

Uropeltidae
Reptiles of India
Endemic fauna of the Western Ghats
Reptiles described in 1875
Taxa named by Albert Günther